Hingyon, officially the Municipality of Hingyon  is a 5th class municipality in the province of Ifugao, Philippines. According to the 2020 census, it has a population of 9,930 people.

Geography

Barangays
Hingyon is politically subdivided into 12 barangays. These barangays are headed by elected officials: Barangay Captain, Barangay Council, whose members are called Barangay Councilors. All are elected every three years.

 Anao
 Bangtinon
 Bitu
 Cababuyan
 Mompolia
 Namulditan
 O-ong
 Piwong
 Poblacion (Hingyon)
 Ubuag
 Umalbong
 Pitawan

Climate

Demographics

Economy

Government
Hingyon, belonging to the lone congressional district of the province of Ifugao, is governed by a mayor designated as its local chief executive and by a municipal council as its legislative body in accordance with the Local Government Code. The mayor, vice mayor, and the councilors are elected directly by the people through an election which is being held every three years.

Elected officials

References

External links
 [ Philippine Standard Geographic Code]
Philippine Census Information
 Local Governance Performance Management System

Municipalities of Ifugao